Sir Evan Spicer   (20 April 1849 – 22 December 1937) was a British Liberal and London Progressive politician who served for 30 years on the London County Council.

Background
Spicer was the son of James Spicer. He was educated at Mill Hill School. In 1873 he married Annie Whitley. They had four sons and two daughters. He was knighted in 1917.

Political career

Spicer was a Progressive Party member of the London County Council from its inception in 1889 until his retirement in 1919. In 1889 he was one of the inaugural Aldermanic appointments. He served three consecutive terms as an Alderman, covering 1889–1907. In 1907, he was elected to the LCC as a Councillor representing Newington West. He served three consecutive terms as a Councillor, covering 1907–1919. On the LCC he was Chairman of Finance from 1892 to 1895. He served as Vice-Chairman of the LCC from 1906 to 1906 and chairman from 1906 to 1907. Despite being assured of an Aldermanic seat, he also chose to run as a Progressive candidate at the LCC elections; In the 1901 London County Council election he ran in the heavily Conservative constituency of the City of London.

Spicer was Liberal candidate for the Dulwich division at the December 1910 General Election.

He was knighted in the 1916 Prime Minister's Resignation Honours.

Electoral record

References

1849 births
1937 deaths
Knights Bachelor
Liberal Party (UK) parliamentary candidates
Progressive Party (London) politicians
Members of London County Council
People educated at Mill Hill School
Politicians awarded knighthoods